Charles Gordon (May 13, 1947 – October 31, 2020) was an American film producer and brother to Lawrence Gordon. The Gordons were raised in a Jewish family in Belzoni, Mississippi.

Gordon was married to his wife, Lynda, for 50 years until he died of cancer on October 31, 2020, in Los Angeles. He was 73 years old.

Gordon has 3 daughters, Jamie, Kate, and Lily.

Selected filmography
He was a producer in all films unless otherwise noted.

Film

As an actor

Television

References

External links

1947 births
2020 deaths
Film producers from Mississippi
American Jews
People from Belzoni, Mississippi
Deaths from cancer in California